Classics is a compilation album by classical crossover soprano Sarah Brightman. It collects previously released material, such as "Pie Jesu", from Andrew Lloyd Webber's Requiem; "Figlio Perduto", "Lascia ch'io pianga" and "La Luna" from Brightman's previous studio albums, and new recordings of some her classical vocal performances, including "Ave Maria", "Dans La Nuit", "Alhambra" and a solo version of the 1997' hit "Time to Say Goodbye".

Entertainment Weekly, although calling Brightman a "stronger song stylist than a singer", gave the album a grade of B−. Classics was re-released in Europe in 2006, with the same cover art but a different track listing, as Classics: The Best of Sarah Brightman.

Track listing

Singles
 "Winter Light" (Canadian promo single) (2001)
 "Ave Maria" (Japanese promo single) (2001)

Charts and certifications

Weekly charts

Year-end charts

Certifications

References

Sarah Brightman albums
2001 compilation albums
Albums produced by Frank Peterson